Nicaragua–Russia relations are the bilateral relations between Russia and Nicaragua.

History
Agreements to open diplomatic missions were signed on October 18, 1979, between Nicaragua and the Soviet Union a few months after the Sandinista revolution. Russia is the sole successor to the Soviet Union, so ties have naturally continued with Russia since the Belavezha Accords. Russia has an embassy in Managua. Nicaragua has an embassy in Moscow.

The USSR developed great relations with the Sandinistas after the overthrow of the Somoza family. During the 1980s, the Soviet Union provided full political, economic, military, and diplomatic support to the left wing government of Nicaragua. This was not only a reaction to the Contra resistance movement but a full-fledged alliance with Soviet Union, which  provided free credit, economic subsidies and heavy weapon grants. The Nicaraguans got at no cost armaments such as heavily armed Mi-24 attack helicopters (Hinds), and Mi-17 transport helicopters.

Nicaragua voted consistently for Communist causes during the 1980s. Cuban army and political delegates, subsidized by Russian money, were permanently staffed in Nicaragua, making the country a member of the Communist bloc.  After Sandinista leader Daniel Ortega returned to power in 2007 Russia took over the patron role for Nicaragua Nicaragua was the second country after Russia to recognize the disputed territories of South Ossetia and Abkhazia. In September 2008, perhaps in response to Nicaragua's support over the breakaway Georgian territories, Russia offered to strengthen ties with Nicaragua and to provide aid to Nicaragua to help rebuild areas damaged by hurricanes. 

In December 2008, Russian warships visited Nicaragua at the invitation of President Daniel Ortega, although Wilfredo Navarro of the opposition Constitutionalist Liberal Party said that without parliamentary approval the naval visit  would be a breach of the Constitution. During the visit, Russian officials donated about $200,000 worth of generators and computers to  hospitals, police, and the army. 

Shortly after, on December 18, 2008, Russia and Nicaragua concluded several bilateral agreements after talks between presidents Dmitry Medvedev and Daniel Ortega in Moscow, including Memorandums of understanding between the countries' agriculture ministries, and between the Russian Federal Space Agency and Nicaragua's Telecommunications and Postal Service Institute. Russian support has become more important to Nicaragua following withdrawal in late 2008 of US and European aid due to concerns about electoral fraud and handling of human rights and democracy. In April 2009, Nicaragua dropped the requirement for Russian tourists to obtain visas. 

After Russia annexed Crimea from Ukraine on 18 March 2014, the Nicaraguan government officially recognized Crimea as a part of Russia.

On July 12, 2014, Vladimir Putin made an official state visit to Nicaragua, meeting in Managua with President Ortega.

In November 2020, Nicaragua opened an honorary consulate on the Crimean peninsula.

In June 2022, Russian state TV announced that the President of Nicaragua Daniel Ortega invited Russian Armed Forces to enter his country in the second half of 2022. State TV host Olga Skabeeva said: "It's time for Russia to roll out something powerful closer to the American city upon a hill."

On 12 October 2022, Nicaragua was one of only four countries in the UN which voted against condemning Russia for its invasion of Ukraine. The resolution was supported by 143 countries while 35 had abstained from voting. Nicaragua had been joined in its opposition to the resolution by North Korea, Syria, and Belarus.

See also 
 Foreign relations of Nicaragua
 Foreign relations of Russia

References

 
Russia
Bilateral relations of Russia
Nicaragua–Russia relations